Badminton has been part of the African Games since 2003 in Abuja, Nigeria.

Medal table

Host cities

Previous winners

References
Africa Badminton: Events

 
All-Africa Games
Badminton tournaments in Africa
Sports at the African Games